Man in Love may refer to:
 Man in Love (2014 film), a South Korean romance drama film
 Man in Love (2021 film), a Taiwanese romance drama film 
 Man in Love, a song by  Infinite from the EP New Challenge

See also
 Men in Love (disambiguation)